Epaminondas Samartzidis (9 September 1965 – 22 June 1996) was a Greek water polo player who competed in the 1988 Summer Olympics and in the 1992 Summer Olympics. He had 319 appearances for the Greece men's national water polo team. He started his career in Aris Thessaloniki. In 1985 final for the Greek Cup, Aris lost the final 8-7, but Samartzidis was the best player. The next season got transferred to powerhouse Ethnikos Piraeus where he won two championships (1988, 1994) and one Greek cup (1988). He had five gold medals in swimming (freestyle).
He was drown on 22 June 1996, when he made free diving near to Palaia Epidavros.

References

1965 births
1996 deaths
Greek male water polo players
Olympic water polo players of Greece
Water polo players at the 1988 Summer Olympics
Water polo players at the 1992 Summer Olympics
Ethnikos WPC

Ethnikos Piraeus Water Polo Club players
Water polo players from Thessaloniki